Kanjampatti is a village in Virudhunagar District, Tamil Nadu, India. In the 2011 census it had a population of 1839 in 542 households. It is south of Aruppukkottai. The village has big reservoir (Kanmai) and vast paddy lands.

Economy
The village depends upon agriculture, cattle and goats for income.  
Most of the village residents migrated to populated cities and towns for industrial and government jobs.

Transport
Transportation is available from Aruppukkattai a few times a day and is about 45 minutes by public transportation.

Adjacent communities

Reference 

Villages in Virudhunagar district